The eighth edition of the Strade Bianche cycling race was held on 8 March 2014. The race started in San Gimignano and finished on the Piazza del Campo in Siena's city centre.

Kwiatkowski had broken clear with Peter Sagan with 21 km remaining. The duo had built a winning lead, and Kwiatkowski distanced his breakaway companion with less than 500m to go on the steep finishing road in the centre of Siena. Sagan was unable to answer the Pole's attack and finished 19 seconds behind Kwiatkowski.

Spaniard Alejandro Valverde set off in pursuit, but was unable to catch the leaders and finished third at 36 seconds from Kwiatkowski. Damiano Cunego and Roman Kreuziger rounded out the top-five.

Teams
The start list included 18 teams – 11 ProTeams and 7 Professional Continental Teams – and a total of 144 riders.

Results

References

Strade Bianche
Strade Bianche
Strade Bianche